The following is a timeline of the history of the city of Tampa in Hillsborough County, Florida, United States.

19th century

 1824 – Fort Brooke established by U.S. Army in the Territory of Florida.
 1831 – Tampa Bay post office established.
 1845 – Tampa Bay becomes part of the new U.S. state of Florida.
 1848 – 1848 Tampa Bay hurricane.
 1849 – Village of Tampa incorporated.
 1850 – Oaklawn Cemetery established.
 1855 – Town of Tampa incorporated.
 1856 – Joseph B. Lancaster becomes mayor.
 1859 – First Baptist Church established.
 1861 – Town becomes part of Confederate States of America.
 1862 – June 30-July 1: Battle of Tampa.
 1863 – October 16–18: Battle of Fort Brooke.
 1873
 Yellow fever outbreak.
 Tampa Guardian newspaper in publication.
 1877 – Gainesville-Tampa stagecoach begins operating.
 1882 – Hillsborough High School opens.
 1884 – South Florida Railroad begins operating.
 1885 – Board of Trade established.
 1886
 Sanchez & Haya cigar factory begins operating.
 Ybor Factory Building constructed.
 1887
 Ybor City becomes part of Tampa.
 Tampa Electric Company established.
 1888 – Plant Park laid out.
 1889 – Florida Railway begins operating.
 1890
 Tampa Business College established.
 Telephones begin operating.
 1891
 Tampa Bay Hotel built.
 Cuban José Martí gives speech "Los Pinos Nuevos".
 1893 – Tampa Daily Times newspaper begins publication.
 1895 – Tampa Fire Department established.
 1899
 Burgert photo studio in business.
 Circulo Cubano founded.
 1900 – Tampa Woman's Club formed.

20th century

1900s-1950s
 1901 – Jackson Rooming House in business.
 1904 – South Florida Fair and Gasparilla Parade begin.
 1905
 Columbia Restaurant in business.
 Sacred Heart Catholic Church and United States Courthouse Building constructed.
 1907
 St. Andrew's Episcopal Church built.
 Havatampa Cigar Company in business.
 1908 – YMCA built.
 1912
 Union Station opens.
 El Centro Español de Tampa building constructed.
 El Comercio Spanish-language newspaper begins publication.
 Union Hotel in business.
 1913 – Centro Asturiano de Tampa building constructed.
 1914 – St. Petersburg-Tampa Airboat Line begins operating.
 1915 – Tampa City Hall built.
 1916 – Heraldo Dominical Spanish-language newspaper begins publication.
 1917
 Tampa Public Library opens.
 Circulo Cubano de Tampa rebuilt.
 1918 – Unione Italiana building constructed.
 1920 – Population: 51,608.
 1922
 WDAE radio begins broadcasting.
 La Gaceta trilingual newspaper begins publication.
 1924 – Gandy Bridge to St. Petersburg built.
 1925
 West Tampa becomes part of Tampa.
 Municipal Auditorium built.
 WFLA radio begins broadcasting.
 1926
 Junior League of Tampa founded.
 Tampa Theatre opens.
 1927
 Sulphur Springs Water Tower erected.
 Floridan Hotel in business.
 1930 – Population: 101,161.
 1931
 Labor strike of cigar workers.
 Tampa Junior College established.
 1934 – Davis Causeway opens.
 1938 – Janus Administration Building constructed.
 1939 – U.S. Army Southeast Air Base established.
 1940 – Population: 108,391.
 1950 – Population: 124,681.
 1955 - WFLA-TV and WTVT (television) begin broadcasting.
 1956 – Britton Plaza Shopping Center in business.
 1957 – Lowry Park Zoo opens.
 1959 – Busch Gardens theme park in business.

1960s-1990s
 1960 – Population: 274,970.
1961 - The Pinellas Manufacturers Association (now known as the Bay Area Manufacturers Association) was formed.
 1962 – Museum of Science and Industry founded.
 1966 – Franklin Exchange Building constructed.
 1968 - Hope Children's Home established.
 1970 – Population: 277,767.
 1972
 Sant'Yago Knight Parade begins.
 Floriland Cinema in business.
 1978 – Cracker Country (museum) established.
 1979
 May 8: Storm.
 Tampa Museum of Art founded.
 1980
 Hillsborough Area Regional Transit established.
 Population: 271,523.
 1981 – Feeding America Tampa Bay active (approximate date).
 1982 – Foreign trade zone and Ybor City Museum Society established.
 1984 – Tampa-Hillsborough County Public Library System established.
 1986 – Barnett Plaza (hi-rise) built.
 1987
 Tampa Bay Performing Arts Center opens.
 Children's Museum founded.
 1988 – Rivergate Tower built.
 1989 – Tampa Bay History Center founded.
 1990
 Tampa International Gay and Lesbian Film Festival begins.
 Population: 280,015.
 1992 – AmSouth Building and SunTrust Financial Centre constructed.
 1995 – Florida Aquarium opens.
 1996
 City website online.
 Ice Palace (arena) opens.
 1997
 Jim Davis becomes U.S. representative for Florida's 11th congressional district.
 Tampa Police Museum founded.
 2000 - Channelside 9 Cinemas in business.

21st century

 2001
 The Stovall built.
 Tampa Gallery of Photographic Arts opens.
 Ruby (programming language) conference held in city.
 2002
 January 5: 2002 Tampa plane crash.
 TECO Line Streetcar begins operating; Centennial Park Station and Tampa Bay Federal Credit Union Station open.
 2003 – Whiting Station opens.
 2004
 Ford Amphitheatre opens.
 Tampa Riverwalk construction begins.
 2007
 SkyPoint built.
 Kathy Castor becomes U.S. representative for Florida's 11th congressional district.
 2009 – Tampa Bay History Center opens.
 2010 – Population: city 335,709; metro 2,783,243.
 2011
 Florida Voices begins publication.
 Bob Buckhorn becomes mayor.
 Population: 346,037; metro 2,824,724.
 2012 – August: 2012 Republican National Convention held.
 2014 – Tampa Baseball Museum opens.
 2018-21 – Water Street Tampa construction takes place
 2019 
 Morsani College of Medicine and Heart Institute opens.
 Jane Castor becomes mayor.

See also
 History of Tampa, Florida
 History of Ybor City
 List of mayors of Tampa, Florida
 National Register of Historic Places listings in Hillsborough County, Florida
 Timelines of other cities in the Central Florida area of Florida: Clearwater, Lakeland, Largo, Orlando, St. Petersburg

References

Bibliography

 
 
 
 
 
  + part 2
  
  (also via Open Library)
 
 
 
  
 Gary R. Mormino, "Tampa: From Hell Hole to the Good Life", in Richard M. Bernard and Bradley R. Rice, eds., Sunbelt Cities: Politics and Growth Since World War II (Austin, 1983)

External links

  (short film)
 
 Items related to Tampa, various dates (via Digital Public Library of America)
  
 
 

 
tampa
Tampa, Florida-related lists